The 1975 City National Buckeye Championships was a men's tennis tournament played on outdoor hard courts at the Buckeye Boys Ranch in Grove City, Columbus, Ohio in the United States that was part of Group B category of the 1975 Grand Prix circuit. It was the sixth edition of the tournament and was held  from August 12 through August 18, 1975. Fourth-seeded Vijay Amritraj won the singles title and earned $9,000 first-prize money.

Finals

Singles
 Vijay Amritraj defeated  Bob Lutz 6–4, 7–5
 It was Amritraj's 1st singles title of the year and 5th of his career.

Doubles
 Bob Lutz /  Stan Smith defeated  Jürgen Fassbender /  Hans-Jürgen Pohmann 6–2, 6–7, 6–3

References

External links
 ITF tournament edition details

Buckeye Tennis Championships
Buckeye Tennis Championships
Buckeye Tennis Championships
Buckeye Tennis Championships